Gol Makan-e Baseri (also Romanized as Gol Makān-e Bāşerī; also known as Gol Makān-e Pā’īn, Gol Makān-e Soflá, Gol Makūn-e Bāşerī, and Qal‘eh-ye Pā’īn) is a village in Abarj Rural District, Dorudzan District, Marvdasht County, Fars Province, Iran. At the 2006 census, its population was 519, in 122 families.

References 

Populated places in Marvdasht County